Joseph Danziger Auerbach was a Yiddish writer. He was the author of Darke Yesharim ('Paths of the Righteous'), a treatise on ethics and morals, published in Amsterdam in 1758.

Publications

References
 

18th-century writers
Jewish ethicists
Jewish writers
Yiddish-language writers